Whitehill-Gleason Motors at 5815 Baum Boulevard in the East Liberty neighborhood of Pittsburgh, Pennsylvania, was built in the 1920s on the site of the first drive-in filling station in the United States (1913).

It was added to the National Register of Historic Places on July 22, 1999, and was granted a Pennsylvania Historical Marker on July 11, 2000.

History
In December 1913, the Gulf Refining Company opened its first drive-in facility, where motorists could purchase gasoline and oil and lubricant maintenance services for their automobiles, as well as road maps. Located on Pittsburgh's Baum Boulevard in the same neighborhood where multiple automobile dealerships were located, the station also offered free air and water and became so successful that additional drive-in filling stations were opened by Gulf and other gasoline retail companies nationwide.

References

Commercial buildings completed in the 20th century
Buildings and structures in Pittsburgh
Transportation buildings and structures on the National Register of Historic Places in Pennsylvania
Art Deco architecture in Pennsylvania
History of Pittsburgh
Retail buildings in Pennsylvania
Gas stations on the National Register of Historic Places in Pennsylvania
National Register of Historic Places in Pittsburgh
1920s establishments in Pennsylvania